David Soucy (born 1957) is an American politician and was a Republican member of the Vermont Senate representing the Rutland District from 2017 to 2019. He was appointed to the State Senate by Governor Phil Scott

Born in Portland, Maine, Soucy graduated from South Portland High School. He attended Marist College. Soucy has been a resident of Vermont since 1997.

He is a former professional golfer. Soucy serves as the head golf professional at the Country Club of Barre, in Barre, Vermont.

References

External links
Official page at the Vermont Legislature

David Soucy at Ballotpedia

1957 births
21st-century American politicians
Living people
People from Rutland County, Vermont
Politicians from Portland, Maine
Marist College alumni
Republican Party Vermont state senators
Golfers from Vermont
American male golfers